Warrenton is a city in Warren County, Georgia, United States. The population was 1,937 at the 2010 census.  The city is the county seat of Warren County.

History
Warrenton was founded in 1797 as seat of Warren County (est. 1793). It was incorporated as a town in 1810 and as a city in 1908. The community was named for American Revolutionary War general Joseph Warren.

On May 2, 1919 a crowd of three hundred white farmers shot to death and burned the corpse of a black farmer, Benny Richards, who was accused of murdering his own ex-wife.

Geography
Warrenton is located at  (33.407596, -82.662914).

Demographics

2020 census

As of the 2020 United States census, there were 1,744 people, 840 households, and 528 families residing in the city.

2000 census
As of the census of 2000, there were 2,013 people, 816 households, and 527 families residing in the city. The racial makeup of the city was 29.41% White, 69.40% African American, 0.25% Native American, 0.15% Asian, 0.25% from other races, and 0.55% from two or more races. Hispanic or Latino of any race were 0.70% of the population.

There were 816 households, out of which 32.2% had children under the age of 18 living with them, 31.1% were married couples living together, 28.7% had a female householder with no husband present, and 35.4% were non-families. 31.4% of all households were made up of individuals, and 15.6% had someone living alone who was 65 years of age or older.  The average household size was 2.45 and the average family size was 3.09.

In the city, the population was spread out, with 29.0% under the age of 18, 9.8% from 18 to 24, 24.0% from 25 to 44, 21.9% from 45 to 64, and 15.3% who were 65 years of age or older.  The median age was 35 years. For every 100 females, there were 80.4 males.  For every 100 females age 18 and over, there were 71.7 males.

The median income for a household in the city was $18,750, and the median income for a family was $25,898. Males had a median income of $26,818 versus $20,625 for females. The per capita income for the city was $12,778.  About 30.7% of families and 36.0% of the population were below the poverty line, including 55.0% of those under age 18 and 26.9% of those age 65 or over.

Education

Warren County School District 
The Warren County School District holds pre-school to grade twelve, and consists of one elementary school, a middle school, and a high school. (The district has only 2 physical buildings, one for Pre-K and K, the other for 1-12.)The district has 70 full-time teachers and over 894 students.
Freeman Elementary School
Warren County Middle School
Warren County High School

See also

 Central Savannah River Area

References

External links
Warrenton on Warren County GA Chamber of Commerce site

Cities in Georgia (U.S. state)
Cities in Warren County, Georgia
County seats in Georgia (U.S. state)